Jennifer Salt is an American producer, screenwriter, and former actress known for playing Eunice Tate on Soap (1977–1981).

Life and career
Salt was born in Los Angeles, California to screenwriter Waldo Salt and actress Mary Davenport. She has a younger sister, Deborah. Her stepmother was the writer Eve Merriam. She attended the High School of Performing Arts in New York City, and graduated from Sarah Lawrence College. Salt's father had been blacklisted by Hollywood for most of the 1950s and early 1960s after a run-in with the House Un-American Activities Committee, but managed a triumphant return with the two movies that won him Oscars.

She made several stage appearances, winning a 1971 Theatre World award as Estelle in the play Father's Day, and she portrayed Eunice Tate-Leitner, the snobbish daughter of Chester and Jessica Tate in the television comedy series Soap. An early movie role was in Midnight Cowboy (1969) as Joe Buck's hometown lover, Crazy Annie. While living with actress Margot Kidder in Malibu in the early 1970s, she worked in tandem with American director Brian De Palma in the films The Wedding Party (1969), Hi, Mom! (1970), and Sisters (1972), and appeared with Cornel Wilde and Scott Glenn in the TV film Gargoyles (1972)..

Salt has retired from acting, and is pursuing her writing career, including episode scripts for Nip/Tuck and other programs. In 1998, she landed her first steady job in her new profession as a low-rung writer on a cable detective drama titled Sins of the City. She is a co-writer of the script for the Julia Roberts film Eat Pray Love (2010) based on Elizabeth Gilbert's best-selling memoir of the same name. In 2011, Salt helped work on a pilot for an HBO series based on the memoir Foreign Babes in Beijing written by Rachel De Woskin.

In 2006, she was nominated for a Writers Guild of America Award for the Nip/Tuck episode "Rhea Reynolds".

Family
Her son, Jonah Greenberg, is a talent agent with CAA Beijing.

Theater

Actress

Filmography

Actress

Writer

Television

Actress

Producer

Writer

|}Six Candles  
(* denotes Writers Guild of America Award nomination)

References

External links

 
 

Living people
American film actresses
American television actresses
20th-century American actresses
Television producers from California
American women television producers
American television writers
Actresses from Los Angeles
American women screenwriters
American women television writers
Screenwriters from California
21st-century American women
Year of birth missing (living people)